Puccinellia lemmonii is a species of grass known by the common name Lemmon's alkaligrass. It is native to western North America, particularly the northwestern United States, where it grows in moist, saline soils.

It is a perennial bunchgrass forming clumps of stems up to 40 centimeters in maximum height with narrow, almost hairlike leaves located around the bases. The inflorescence is a spreading array of a few branches containing rough-haired spikelets.

References

External links
Jepson Manual Treatment
USDA Plants Profile
Grass Manual Treatment

lemmonii
Bunchgrasses of North America
Grasses of the United States
Grasses of Canada
Native grasses of California